Evgeniya Sergeevna Zakharova (born 4 October 1994) is a Russian short track speed skater.

Zakharova represents Russia at international competitions. She won the bronze medal at the 2020 European Short Track Speed Skating Championships in the 3000m relay event, where she only competed in the preliminaries.

References

1994 births
People from Novouralsk
Russian female short track speed skaters
Living people
World Short Track Speed Skating Championships medalists
Universiade medalists in short track speed skating
Universiade gold medalists for Russia
Universiade silver medalists for Russia
Competitors at the 2013 Winter Universiade
Competitors at the 2019 Winter Universiade
Sportspeople from Sverdlovsk Oblast
21st-century Russian women